Jawbone is the pseudonym of Bob Zabor, an American blues musician from Detroit. He is particularly unusual in that he is a one-man band. The instruments he plays include the harmonica, the guitar and the tambourine. He deliberately aims for a lo-fi sound, akin to early blues recordings.

His work appeared on BBC Radio 1's John Peel show in 2004, and has been included on various magazine CDs there.

Discography
 Dang Blues (2004 CD,  Loose Music
 "Hi-De-Hi" b/w "Walter John" (7" Record)
 Johnny Cash Tribute CD (free with Mojo magazine, featuring "Get Rhythm")
 This Is Punk Rock Blues Vol. 1 (Various Artists, CD featuring "4-11-44")
 Hauling (2006 CD, Loose Music)
 "Chug a Lug" b/w "Get Rhythm" (7" Record)

References

External links
 Jawbone's website
 www.loosemusic.com

American street performers
American blues harmonica players
American blues guitarists
American male guitarists
American blues singers
One-man bands
Living people
Tambourine players
Year of birth missing (living people)